The 1948–49 Rugby Union County Championship was the 49th edition of England's premier rugby union club competition at the time.

Lancashire won the competition for the sixth time and third in succession after defeating Gloucestershire in the final.

Final

See also
 English rugby union system
 Rugby union in England

References

Rugby Union County Championship
County Championship (rugby union) seasons